The Directorate-General for Energy (DG Ener), or ENER, is a Directorate-General of the European Commission, created on 17 February 2010 when it was separated from the Transport DG, with which it had been combined since 2000.

Mission
The Directorate-General for Energy is responsible for promoting and regulating the European Energy Union and, since 2019, overseeing the implementation of the Clean Energy for all Europeans package as part of the European Green New Deal.

Resources
The Directorate-General for Energy, based primarily in Brussels, reports to Kadri Simson, European Commissioner for Energy. The former Commissioner for Energy and Climate was Miguel Arias Cañete. The current Director-General is Ms Ditte Juul-Jorgensen, former Director-Generals include Mr Dominique Ristori and Mr Phillip Lowe.

Structure
The Directorate-General is made up of 6 Directorates (two of which deal with EURATOM issues), and the Euratom Supply Agency.

See also
Energy policy of the European Union
EURATOM
European Commissioner for Energy
Green procurement

References

External links
 The European Commission's portal for Energy
 Europe's Energy Portal

Energy
Energy policies and initiatives of the European Union
Energy regulatory authorities
Regulation in the European Union